Smyley Island is an Antarctic island lying off the Antarctic Peninsula. It connects to the Stange Ice Shelf and is separated from Alexander Island by the Ronne Entrance. Smyley Island is one of the 27 islands of Palmer Land, Antarctica.

Discovery and naming
In 1939–1941 Smyley Island was first identified as a peninsula of mainland Antarctica by the United States Antarctic Service and was named Cape Smyley. In 1968 it was identified as an island on a U.S. Geological Survey map. The island is named after Captain William H. Smyley, the American master of the sealing vessel Ohio during 1841–42.

Important Bird Area
A 497 ha site on fast ice near Scorseby Head, on the northern shore of the island, has been designated an Important Bird Area (IBA) by BirdLife International because it supports a breeding colony of some 6,000 emperor penguins, based on 2009 satellite imagery.

See also
 Composite Antarctic Gazetteer
 List of Antarctic and Subantarctic islands
 List of Antarctic islands south of 60° S 
 Scientific Committee on Antarctic Research
 Territorial claims in Antarctica

References

External links
British Antarctic Survey diary

Important Bird Areas of Antarctica
Penguin colonies
Islands of Palmer Land